Loesch or Lösch may refer to:

 Dorothea Maria Lösch (1730–1799), mariner
 Dana Loesch (born 1978), American radio host
 Frank J. Loesch (1852–1944), prominent Chicago attorney, crime fighter
 Harrison Loesch (1916–1997), assistant Secretary of the Interior under Richard Nixon
 Gerrit Lösch (born 1941), minister
 Harold Loesch (1926–2011), marine biologist and oceanographer
 Ingeborg Loesch, sprint canoer
 Juli Loesch (born 1951), activist
 Markus Lösch (born 1971), football player

See also
 Lesh
 Losch